Van, Arkansas is an unincorporated community in Arkansas County, Arkansas, United States. The community is located on Arkansas Highway 153.

References

Unincorporated communities in Arkansas County, Arkansas
Unincorporated communities in Arkansas